The Cox Furniture Store (also known as the Simonson Opera House or Edwards Opera House or New Baird Theater) c. 1890 is a historic site in Gainesville, Florida, United States.  Built in the form and style of a small Romanesque Revival church, it is located at 19 Southeast First Avenue. On June 10, 1994, it was added to the U.S. National Register of Historic Places.

References

External links
 Alachua County listings at National Register of Historic Places
 Alachua County listings at Florida's Office of Cultural and Historical Programs
 Virtual tour of Downtown Gainesville and Related Structures at Alachua County's Department of Growth Management

Buildings and structures in Gainesville, Florida
National Register of Historic Places in Gainesville, Florida